Ramón Polo Pardo (13 April 1901 – 19 June 1966) was a Spanish footballer who played as an outside forward, and was a former manager.

Club career
Born in Corcubión, Province of A Coruña, Polo played his entire professional career with Celta de Vigo also in his native Galicia, after Real Fortuna Football Club merged with Real Vigo Sporting Club in 1923. He competed with the club in Segunda División and Tercera División, scoring an all-time best 159 goals in 259 games all competitions comprised even though he was not a pure striker.

Having studied in his youth to be a priest, Polo was known in Argentina as the black shadow of Américo Tesoriere, as he was the only European player capable of scoring against him. In a game against Deportivo de La Coruña, he converted a penalty kick with a broken fibula.

Polo retired in 1935 at the age of 34, going on to manage SG Lucense in the second level in the early 50s. He died on 19 June 1966, aged 65.

International career
Polo gained two caps for Spain during seven years, in as many friendlies. His debut took place on 4 October 1925, in a 1–0 win over Hungary in Budapest.

References

External links

1901 births
1966 deaths
Sportspeople from the Province of A Coruña
Spanish footballers
Footballers from Galicia (Spain)
Association football forwards
Segunda División players
Tercera División players
RC Celta de Vigo players
Spain B international footballers
Spain international footballers
Spanish football managers
Segunda División managers
CD Lugo managers